Délizia Adamo better known as Délizia (June 23, 1952 – February 9, 2020) was a singer of Italian–Belgian origin and sister of international singer Salvatore Adamo.

She had her debut single "Prend le chien" at age 14. It was written by her brother Adamo. She followed courses in drawing and took part in a comedy production at Théatre de l'Ancre in Charleroi, where she interpreted Kataeiv's "Je veux voir Moscou". She also followed dramatic arts courses at the Royal Conservatory of Brussels.

In 1974, Salvatore Adamo wrote her some songs releasing "Qui te retient" and "Aime-moi" as singles. The next year, she took part in some of his tours. In 1976 and again in 1978, she participated in pre-selections for the Belgian entry to Eurovision Song Contest but without success. She had a comeback in 1982 with "Une première danse", a song co-written by Michel Legrand and Charles Aznavour.

Discography

EP
1966: A1 : "Prends le chien"  (S. Adamo) / A2 : "Monsieur le professeur" (S. Adamo) / B1 : "J'ai rendez-vous" (S. Adamo) / B2 : "Laissons passer les années" (S. Adamo)

Singles
(Side A and Side B, writer in parenthesis)
1974: "Qui te retient?" – (S. Adamo) / "Aime-moi" – (S. Adamo)
1975: "Vivre avec toi" – (S. Adamo) / "Bye bye love" – (S. Adamo)
1975: "Alors, le bel été" – (S. Adamo) / "Je te suivrai" – (S. Adamo)
1976: "Un hiver avec toi" – (Didier Barbelivien, V. Paradiso) / "Ma prière" – (Roby Facchinetti, Patrick Loiseau, Valerio Negrini)
1976: "Le procès de l'amour" – (Phil Coulter, Bill Martin, Christian Ravasco) / "Le temps pardonne" – (Óscar Gómez, Michel Jouveaux)
1977: "Du côté de l’amour" – (C. Lee, G. Allun Michel, T. Boyce) / "Reviens" – (J. Keller, M. Jouveaux, P. Vance)
1978: "Qui viendra réinventer l’amour?" - (S. Adamo) / "Comme un feu qui dort (Alors le bel été)" - (S. Adamo)

References

External links
Délizia: Discography Encyclopédisque.

1952 births
2020 deaths
Belgian women singers
Belgian people of Italian descent